Teh Kok Lim is a Malaysian politician who has served as Member of the Perak State Executive Council (EXCO) in the Barisan Nasional (BN) state administration under Menteri Besar Saarani Mohamad and Member of the Perak State Legislative Assembly (MLA) for Aulong since November 2022. He served as the Member of Parliament (MP) for Taiping from May 2018 to November 2022 and the MLA for Pokok Assam from May 2013 to May 2018. He is a member of the Democratic Action Party (DAP), a component party of the Pakatan Harapan (PH) coalition.  

In the 2018 general election, Teh was elected to the Parliament of Malaysia for the Taiping constituency, winning 42,997 of the 69,743 votes cast. In the 2022 Perak state election, he was elected to the Perak State Legislative Assembly for the Aulong seat, winning 20,306 of the 30,665 votes cast. On 22 November 2022, he was also appointed as a Perak EXCO member.

Election results

Notes

References

Living people
Malaysian politicians of Chinese descent
Democratic Action Party (Malaysia) politicians
Members of the Dewan Rakyat
Members of the Perak State Legislative Assembly
21st-century Malaysian politicians
1970 births